Raul Usupov (Georgian: რაულ უსუფოვი / Raul Usupovi; Azeri: Raul Yusupov) (1980 – February 3, 2005) was a politician in the nation of Georgia and deputy governor of Kvemo Kartli region. 

He was born in the village of Karajala, near Telavi, Kakheti, to Azeri parents - Yashar and Lily Usupov. At the age of 20, he moved to Tbilisi, where he got married and had a daughter. He later joined Georgia's United National Movement, then led by Zurab Zhvania (who later became Georgia's Prime Minister). He became a close friend of Zhvania and it was in Usupov's flat in Tbilisi that the two men were found dead in the early hours of the morning of 3 February 2005, apparently as a result of a natural gas leak, and with "no sign of foul play", according to Georgian authorities and FBI officers.

References

1980 births
2005 deaths
United National Movement (Georgia) politicians
Georgian Azerbaijanis
People from Telavi
Accidental deaths in Georgia (country)
Deaths from carbon monoxide poisoning